Fargoa is a genus of very small sea snails, marine gastropod mollusks in the tribe Chrysallidini within the family Pyramidellidae.

Life habits
The members of Fargoa are ectoparasites on the serpulid polychaete Hydroides.

Species
Species within the genus Fargoa include:
 Fargoa calesi (Bartsch, 1955) = Fargoa bushiana (Bartsch, 1909) - as Odostomia bushiana, type species
 Fargoa bartschi (Winkley, 1909)
 Fargoa buijsei (de Jong & Coomans, 1988)
 Fargoa dianthophila (H. W. Wells & M. J. Wells, 1961)
 Fargoa dux (Dall & Bartsch, 1906)
 Fargoa gaudens Odé, 1993
 Fargoa gibbosa (Bush, 1909)

References

External links
 Fargoa dianthophila - Serpulid odostome
 Fargoa buijsei - Buijse’s Odostome

Pyramidellidae